This is a list of genetic genealogy topics.

Important concepts
 Genetic genealogy
 Genealogical DNA test
 Human mitochondrial DNA haplogroups
 Human Y-chromosome DNA haplogroups
 Allele
 Allele frequency
 Electropherogram
 Genetic recombination
 Haplogroup
 Haplotype
 * (haplogroup)
 Most recent common ancestor
 Short tandem repeat (STR)
 Single nucleotide polymorphism (SNP)
 Y-STR (Y-chromosome short tandem repeat)

Related fields
 Archaeogenetics
 Genealogy
 Genetics
 Genetic fingerprinting
 DNA sequencing
 Population genetics
 Molecular genetics

Patrilineal relationships
 Patrilineality
 XY sex-determination system
 Y-chromosomal Adam
 Y-chromosomal Aaron
 Adam's Curse
 Paternal mtDNA transmission
 RecLOH

Matrilineal relationships
 Matrilineality
 Mitochondrion
 Mitochondrial DNA
 Human mitochondrial genetics
 Mitochondrial Eve
 X chromosome

Biogeography, ethnicity and migration
 Human migration
 Population genetics
 Multiregional hypothesis
 Single-origin hypothesis

Projects
 Human Genome Project
 International HapMap Project
 Molecular Genealogy Research Project
 Surname DNA project
 The Genographic Project

Lists
 List of Y-chromosome databases
 List of DNA tested mummies
 List of DNA tested historical figures
 List of genetic results derived from historical figures
 Y-chromosome haplogroups in populations of the world

See also 
 List of genetics-related topics

Genetic genealogy
Genetic genealogy
Genetic genealogy topics
Genetic genealogy topics